Otto Gray and his Oklahoma Cowboys were the first nationally famous cowboy western music band in the United States, and the first cowboy band to appear on the cover of Billboard (June 6, 1931).

Formed in Ripley, Oklahoma in the early 1920s, the band was first known as McGinty's Oklahoma Cowboy Band, for the leader, Billy McGinty, a well-known cowboy, former Rough Rider, and world champion rider with Buffalo Bill's show.

The band members were authentic cowboys from ranches in and around Ripley. Their first promoter, George Youngblood, introduced them saying, "I wish to say of this bunch of cowboys that they are not only good fiddlers, but can ride or rope anything that has horns, hide or hair." After McGinty left to become the postmaster of Ripley, Otto Gray (1884–1967), took over as bandleader as well as manager. With the extensive traveling generated from their popularity, the original band members dropped out to stay with their jobs and families. Gray filled their places with professional musicians willing to spend most of their time on the road.

Playing on the vaudeville circuits in the Midwest and Northeast, and nationwide over some 130 radio stations, they played the first cowboy music most Americans outside of the West had ever heard.

One of their most popular tunes was "Midnight Special", performed by member Dave "Pistol Pete" Cutrell; Cutrell's "Pistol Pete's Midnight Special" with McGinty's band was also the first version of "Midnight Special" ever recorded.

The band lasted until the early 1930s when economic situations led them to disband.

Selected discography
Original recording dates.
{| border="2" cellspacing="0" cellpadding="4" rules="all" style="margin:1em 1em 1em 0; border-style:solid; border-width:1px; border-collapse:collapse; empty-cells:show;  "
|- bgcolor='#FFDEAD'
!Recording Date
!Matrix No.
!Title
!Record Label
|-
|May 1926
|9648-A
|"Cow Boy's Dream"
|OKeh 45057
|-
|May 1926
|9650-1
|"Pistol Pete's Midnight Special"
|OKeh 45057
|-
|January 17, 1928
|13365-A
|"It Can't Be Done"
|Gennett 6376
|-
|January 17, 1928
|13366
|"Adam And Eve"
|Gennett 6376
|-
|January 17, 1928
|13367
|"Lone Prairie"
|Gennett unissued
|-
|January 17, 1928
|13368
|"Your Mother Still Prays For You, Jack"
|Gennett 6387
|-
|January 28, 1928
|13407
|"It Can't Be Done"
|Champion 15446
|-
|January 28, 1928
|13408
|"Adam and Eve"
|Gennett unissued
|-
|January 28, 1928
|13409
|"Bury Me On The Lone Prairie"
|Gennett 6405
|-
|January 28, 1928
|13411
|"Drunkards Lone Child"
|Gennett 6405
|-
|January 28, 1928
|13412
|"In the Baggage Coach Ahead"
|Gennett 6387
|-
|September 17, 1928
|C-2317
|"It Can't Be Done"
|Vocalion 5250
|-
|September 17, 1928
|C-2318
|"Adam and Eve"
|Vocalion 5250
|-
|September 17, 1928
|C-2319
|"Tom Cat Blues"
|Vocalion 5267
|-
|September 17, 1928
|C-2320
|"Coon Hunt"
|Vocalion 5267
|-
|October 1928
|C-2435
|"Your Mother Still Prays For You, Jack"
|Vocalion 5301
|-
|October 1928
|C-2436
|"Be Home Early Tonight My Dear Boy"
|Vocalion 5301
|-
|October 1928
|C-2437
|"Barefoot Boy With Boots On"
|Vocalion 5256
|-
|October 1928
|C-2438
|"I Had But Fifty Cents"
|Vocalion 5256
|-
|March 12 or 13, 1929
|C-3108
|"Plant A Watermelon On My Grave"
|Vocalion 5327
|-
|March 12 or 13, 1929
|C-3109
|"The Terrible Marriage"
|Vocalion 5327
|-
|March 12 or 13, 1929
|C-3110
|"I Can't Change It"
|Vocalion 5337
|-
|March 12 or 13, 1929
|C-3111
|"Midnight Special"
|Vocalion 5337
|-
|May 20, 1930
|g-16635
|"Down Where the Swanee River Flows"
|Champion 16027
|-
|May 20, 1930
|g-16636
|"Gathering Up the Shells From the Seashore"
|Champion 16027
|-
|February 16, 1931
|E-35856
|"Who Stole The Lock On The Henhouse Door"
|Melotone M12182
Vocalion 5479
|-
|February 16, 1931
|E-35857
|"Cat Came Back"
|Melotone M12127
|-
|February 16, 1931
|E-35858
|"Suckin' Cider"
|Melotone M12127
|-
|February 16, 1931
|E-35859
|"When You Come To the End of the Day"
|Melotone M12223
|-
|February 16, 1931
|E-35860
|"4000 Years Ago"
|Melotone M12182
Vocalion 5479
|-
|February 16, 1931
|E-35861
|"Mammy's Little Coal Black Rose"
|Melotone M 12223
|}

References

Bibliography
Chlouber, Carla. "Otto Gray and his Oklahoma Cowboys: The Country's First Commercial Western Band". Chronicles of Oklahoma, (Winter, 1997–98) 75:4 356-383.
Cohen, Norm. Long Steel Rail: The Railroad in American Folksong. University of Illinois Press (2nd ed), 2000. 
Kite, Steve. "Billy McGinty & His Cowboy Band Take to the Air" (transcription). Oklahoma Audio Almanac. Oklahoma State University, May 9, 2001.
McRill, Leslie A. "Music in Oklahoma by the Billy McGinty Cowboy Band". Chronicles of Oklahoma, (Spring, 1960) 38:1 66-74.
Otto Gray's Oklahoma Cowboys. Early Cowboy Band. British Archive of Country Music, CD D 139, 2006.
Russell, Tony. Country Music Records: A Discography, 1921-1942. Oxford University Press, 2004. 
Shirley, Glenn "Daddy of the Cowboy Bands. Oklahoma Today (Fall 1959), 9:4 6-7, 29.
Wolfe, Charles K. and James E. Akenson (eds). Women of Country Music: A Reader. University Press of Kentucky, 2003.

External links
 Encyclopedia of Oklahoma History and Culture - Gray, Otto and His Oklahoma Cowboys

updated link
Music of Oklahoma
Culture of the Western United States
Gennett Records artists
Okeh Records artists